
Wolf Run may refer to:

Ohio
 Wolf Run, Ohio, unincorporated community in Jefferson County
 Wolf Run State Park, in Caldwell

Pennsylvania
 Wolf Run (Bowman Creek), in Luzerne County
 Wolf Run (Muncy Creek), in Lycoming County
 Wolf Run (North Branch Mehoopany Creek), in Bradford and Sullivan Counties
 Wolf Run (Tohickon Creek), in Bucks County
 Wolf Run (Sugar Creek tributary), in Venango County
 Wolf Run (Buffalo Creek tributary), in Washington County

West Virginia
 Wolf Run (Tygart Valley River tributary), a stream in Barbour County
 Wolf Run, West Virginia, unincorporated community in Marshall County

Other uses

 Wolfrun, the Japanese name of Ulric, a character in Glitter Force

See also
 Run Wolf Run, 1994 studio album by the Japanese rock band Guitar Wolf